Usje is a village in the municipality of Kisela Voda, North Macedonia. It is located just a few kilometers from downtown Skopje.

Demographics
As of the 2021 census, Usje had 1,035 residents with the following ethnic composition:
Macedonians 970
Persons for whom data are taken from administrative sources 40
Serbs 15
Others 10

According to the 2002 census, the village had a total of 845 inhabitants. Ethnic groups in the village include:
Macedonians 830
Turks 1
Serbs 6
Aromanians 7
Others 1

References

Villages in Kisela Voda Municipality